Miranda is one of the 20 municipalities (municipios) that makes up the Venezuelan state of Trujillo and, according to a 2011 population estimate by the National Institute of Statistics of Venezuela, the municipality has a population of 29,445. The town of El Dividive is the municipal seat of Miranda Municipality.

References

Municipalities of Trujillo (state)